Tandridge Priory was a priory in Surrey, England.

History
Tandridge Priory was originally a hospital founded in 1189–99 by Odo de Dammartin, and became an Augustinian Priory in 1218.

It was a small foundation, probably not more than five canons, whose chief duty was to pray for the priory's benefactors. In the Valor Ecclesiasticus of 1535, the clear annual value of this priory was just less than a fifth of for example larger Sheen in the north of the county at £81 7s. 4d (annually). The priory then held the rectory (church lands, tithes and donations) of Tandridge producing £13 6s. 8d, the rectory of Crowhurst £8 6s, and half the rectory of Godstone alias Wolkensted paying £3 11s. 8d. John Lyngfield, the last prior, obtained a pension of £14.  Along with almost all such institutions it was dissolved in 1538 (see Dissolution of the Monasteries), doing away with the role of monasteries and chantries and enabling the bestowal of lands by Henry VIII as part of the Reformation.

Successor to main site
There is now a Grade II listed 17th-century country house on the far north of the site and horse riding centre on the remainder, with the original priory and three fishponds in the grounds at the rear.

References

Monasteries in Surrey